The Volleyball Tournament at the 2005 Mediterranean Games was held in the Mediterranean Sports Palace and the Moisés Ruiz Sports Hall of the Diputación from Friday June 24 to Sunday July 3, 2005 in Almería, Spain.

Medal summary

Events

See also
2005 Women's European Volleyball Championship

References
 Results

 
Sports at the 2005 Mediterranean Games
2005 in volleyball
2005